ATA Packet Interface (ATAPI) is a protocol that has been added to Parallel ATA and Serial ATA so that a greater variety of devices can be connected to a computer than with the ATA command set alone. It carries SCSI commands and responses through the ATA interface. ATAPI devices include CD-ROM and DVD-ROM drives, tape drives, magneto-optical drives, and large-capacity floppy drives such as the Zip drive and SuperDisk drive.

Background 

ATA was originally designed for, and worked only with hard disks and devices that could emulate them. A group called the Small Form Factor committee (SFF) introduced ATAPI (ATA Packet Interface) ATA to be used for a variety of other devices that require functions beyond those necessary for hard disks. For example, any removable media device needs a "media eject" command, and a way for the host to determine whether the media is present, and these were not provided in the ATA protocol.

The Small Form Factor committee approached this problem by defining ATAPI, the "ATA Packet Interface," as part of the fourth generation of ATA. ATAPI carries SCSI commands through ATA, so ATAPI devices are "speaking SCSI" other than at the electrical interface. In fact, some early ATAPI devices were simply SCSI devices with an ATA/ATAPI to SCSI protocol converter added on. The SCSI commands and responses are embedded in "packets" (hence "ATA Packet Interface") for transmission on the ATA cable. This interfaces ATA with any device class for which a SCSI command set has been defined. ATAPI devices are also "speaking ATA" because the ATA physical interface and protocol are still being used to send the packets.

The Direct Memory Access feature for the ATA interface was introduced along with ATAPI.

Definition 

The SCSI commands and responses used by each class of ATAPI device (CD-ROM, tape, etc.) are described in other documents or specifications specific to those device classes and are not within ATA/ATAPI or the T13 committee's purview.  One commonly used set is defined in the MMC SCSI command set.

ATAPI was adopted as part of ATA in INCITS 317-1998, AT Attachment with Packet Interface Extension (ATA/ATAPI-4).

See also 
 SCSI / ATA Translation (SAT)

References

External links
 

Communications protocols
AT Attachment
SCSI